Laze pri Oneku is a settlement in the Municipality of Kočevje in southern Slovenia. It was a village settled by Gottschee Germans. During the Second World War its original population was expelled. The area is part of the traditional region of Lower Carniola and is now included in the Southeast Slovenia Statistical Region.

Name
The name of the settlement was changed from Laze to Laze pri Oneku in 1955.

Church
The local church, dedicated to Saint Joseph, was a Late Gothic church that was demolished after 1947.

References

External links
Laze pri Oneku on Geopedia
Pre–World War II map of Laze pri Oneku with oeconyms and family names

Populated places in the Municipality of Kočevje